Alphonsea maingayi is a species of plant in the Annonaceae family. It native to Peninsular Malaysia and possibly Singapore.

Description
Alphonsea maingayi is a middling to tall tree, whose branches are black. It has elliptic/oblong/lanceolate leaves which are shiny on the upper surface and whose lower surface has a dense covering of rusty, short, soft hairs.

Taxonomy & naming
It was first described in 1872 by Joseph Dalton Hooker and Thomas Thomson. The specific epithet, maingayi, honours the botanist, Alexander Carroll Maingay.

References

maingayi
Flora of Peninsular Malaysia
Taxonomy articles created by Polbot
Taxa named by Joseph Dalton Hooker
Plants described in 1872